A nation is a community of people composed of one or more 
ethnicities and possessing a more or less defined territory and government, usually formed on the basis of a combination of shared features such as language, history, ethnicity, culture and/or society. Some nations are equated with ethnic groups (see ethnic nationalism) and some are equated with affiliation to a social and political constitution (see civic nationalism and multiculturalism). A nation is generally more overtly political than an ethnic group. A nation has also been defined as a cultural-political community that has become conscious of its autonomy, unity and particular interests.

The consensus among scholars is that nations are socially constructed and historically contingent. Throughout history, people have had an attachment to their kin group and traditions, territorial authorities and their homeland, but nationalism – the belief that state and nation should align as a nation state – did not become a prominent ideology until the end of the 18th century. There are three notable perspectives on how nations developed. Primordialism (perennialism), which reflects popular conceptions of nationalism but has largely fallen out of favour among academics, proposes that there have always been nations and that nationalism is a natural phenomenon. Ethnosymbolism explains nationalism as a dynamic, evolving phenomenon and stresses the importance of symbols, myths and traditions in the development of nations and nationalism. Modernization theory, which has superseded primordialism as the dominant explanation of nationalism, adopts a constructivist approach and proposes that nationalism emerged due to processes of modernization, such as industrialization, urbanization, and mass education, which made national consciousness possible.

Proponents of modernization theory describe nations as "imagined communities", a term coined by Benedict Anderson. A nation is an imagined community in the sense that the material conditions exist for imagining extended and shared connections and that it is objectively impersonal, even if each individual in the nation experiences themselves as subjectively part of an embodied unity with others. For the most part, members of a nation remain strangers to each other and will likely never meet. Nationalism is consequently seen an "invented tradition" in which shared sentiment provides a form of collective identity and binds individuals together in political solidarity. A nation's foundational "story" may be built around a combination of ethnic attributes, values and principles, and may be closely connected to narratives of belonging.

Etymology and terminology
The English word nation came from the Latin natio, supine of verb nascar « to birth » (supine : natum), through French. In Latin, natio represents the children of the same birth and also a human group of same origin. By Cicero, natio is used for "people". Old French word nacion – meaning "birth" (naissance), "place of origin" –, which in turn originates from the Latin word natio (nātĭō) literally meaning "birth".

Black's Law Dictionary defines a nation as follows:
nation, n. (14c) 1. A large group of people having a common origin, language, and tradition and usu. constituting a political entity. • When a nation is coincident with a state, the term nation-state is often used....
...
2. A community of people inhabiting a defined territory and organized under an independent government; a sovereign political state....

The word "nation" is sometimes used as synonym for:
 State (polity) or sovereign state: a government that controls a specific territory, which may or may not be associated with any particular ethnic group
 Country: a geographic territory, which may or may not have an affiliation with a government or ethnic group

Thus the phrase "nations of the world" could be referring to the top-level governments (as in the name for the United Nations), various large geographical territories, or various large ethnic groups of the planet.

Depending on the meaning of "nation" used, the term "nation state" could be used to distinguish larger states from small city states, or could be used to distinguish multinational states from those with a single ethnic group.

Medieval nations
Susan Reynolds has argued that many European medieval kingdoms were nations in the modern sense except that political participation in nationalism was available only to a limited prosperous and literate class.

Adrian Hastings has claimed that England's Anglo-Saxon kings mobilized mass nationalism in their struggle to repel Norse invasions. He argues that Alfred the Great, in particular, drew on biblical nationalism, using biblical language in his law code and that during his reign selected books of the Bible were translated into Old English to inspire Englishmen to fight to turn back the Norse invaders. Hastings argues for a strong renewal of English nationalism (following a hiatus after the Norman conquest) beginning with the translation of the complete bible into English by the Wycliffe circle in the 1380s, positing that English nationalism and the English nation have been continuous since that time.

The Medieval Bulgarian nation is another possible example. Danubian Bulgaria was founded in 680-681 as a continuation of Great Bulgaria. After the adoption of Orthodox Christianity in 864 it became one of the cultural centres of Slavic Europe. Its leading cultural position was consolidated with the invention of the Cyrillic script in its capital Preslav at the eve of the 10th century. The development of Old Church Slavonic literacy in the country had the effect of preventing the assimilation of the South Slavs into neighbouring cultures and it also stimulated the development of a distinct ethnic identity. A symbiosis was carried out between the numerically weak Bulgars and the numerous Slavic tribes in that broad area from the Danube to the north, to the Aegean Sea to the south, and from the Adriatic Sea to the west, to the Black Sea to the east, who accepted the common ethnonym "Bulgarians". During the 10th century the Bulgarians established a form of national identity that was far from modern nationalism but helped them to survive as a distinct entity through the centuries.

Another example of Medieval nationalism is the Declaration of Arbroath (1320), a document produced by Scottish nobles and clergy during the Scottish Wars of Independence. The purpose of the document was to demonstrate to the Pope that Scotland was indeed a nation of its own, with its own unique culture, history and language and that it was indeed an older nation than England. The document went on to justify the actions of Robert the Bruce and his forces in resisting the occupation and to chastise the English for having violated Scottish sovereignty without justification. The propaganda campaign supplemented a military campaign on the part of the Bruce, which after the Battle of Bannockburn was successful and eventually resulted in the end of England's occupation and recognition of Scottish independence on the part of the English crown. The document is widely seen as an early example of both Scottish nationalism and popular sovereignty.

Anthony Kaldellis asserts in Hellenism in Byzantium (2008) that what is called the Byzantine Empire was the Roman Empire transformed into a nation-state in the Middle Ages.

Azar Gat is among the scholars who argue that China, Korea and Japan were nations by the time of the European Middle Ages.

Use of term nationes by medieval universities and other medieval institutions

A significant early use of the term nation, as natio, occurred at Medieval universities to describe the colleagues in a college or students, above all at the University of Paris, who were all born within a pays, spoke the same language and expected to be ruled by their own familiar law. In 1383 and 1384, while studying theology at Paris, Jean Gerson was elected twice as a procurator for the French natio. The University of Prague adopted the division of students into nationes: from its opening in 1349 the studium generale which consisted of Bohemian, Bavarian, Saxon and Polish nations.

In a similar way, the nationes were segregated by the Knights Hospitaller of Jerusalem, who maintained at Rhodes the hostels from which they took their name "where foreigners eat and have their places of meeting, each nation apart from the others, and a Knight has charge of each one of these hostels, and provides for the necessities of the inmates according to their religion", as the Spanish traveller Pedro Tafur noted in 1436.

Early modern nations

In his article, "The Mosaic Moment: An Early Modernist Critique of the Modernist Theory of Nationalism", Philip S. Gorski argues that the first modern nation-state was the Dutch Republic, created by a fully modern political nationalism rooted in the model of biblical nationalism. In a 2013 article "Biblical nationalism and the sixteenth-century states", Diana Muir Appelbaum expands Gorski's argument to apply to a series of new, Protestant, sixteenth-century nation states. A similar, albeit broader, argument was made by Anthony D. Smith in his books, Chosen Peoples: Sacred Sources of National Identity and Myths and Memories of the Nation.

In her book Nationalism: Five Roads to Modernity, Liah Greenfeld argued that nationalism was invented in England by 1600. According to Greenfeld, England was “the first nation in the world".

Social science
Scholars in the 19th and early 20th century offered constructivist criticisms of primordial theories about nations. A prominent lecture by Ernest Renan, "What is a Nation?", argues that a nation is "a daily referendum", and that nations are based as much on what the people jointly forget as on what they remember. Carl Darling Buck argued in a 1916 study, "Nationality is essentially subjective, an active sentiment of unity, within a fairly extensive group, a sentiment based upon real but diverse factors, political, geographical, physical, and social, any or all of which may be present in this or that case, but no one of which must be present in all cases."

In the late 20th century, many social scientists argued that there were two types of nations, the civic nation of which French republican society was the principal example and the ethnic nation exemplified by the German peoples. The German tradition was conceptualized as originating with early 19th-century philosophers, like Johann Gottlieb Fichte, and referred to people sharing a common language, religion, culture, history, and ethnic origins, that differentiate them from people of other nations. On the other hand, the civic nation was traced to the French Revolution and ideas deriving from 18th-century French philosophers. It was understood as being centred in a willingness to "live together", this producing a nation that results from an act of affirmation. This is the vision, among others, of Ernest Renan.

Debate about a potential future of nations

There is an ongoing debate about the future of nations − about whether this framework will persist as is and whether there are viable or developing alternatives.

The theory of the clash of civilizations lies in direct contrast to cosmopolitan theories about an ever more-connected world that no longer requires nation states. According to political scientist Samuel P. Huntington, people's cultural and religious identities will be the primary source of conflict in the post–Cold War world.

The theory was originally formulated in a 1992 lecture at the American Enterprise Institute, which was then developed in a 1993 Foreign Affairs article titled "The Clash of Civilizations?", in response to Francis Fukuyama's 1992 book, The End of History and the Last Man. Huntington later expanded his thesis in a 1996 book The Clash of Civilizations and the Remaking of World Order.

Huntington began his thinking by surveying the diverse theories about the nature of global politics in the post–Cold War period. Some theorists and writers argued that human rights, liberal democracy and capitalist free market economics had become the only remaining ideological alternative for nations in the post–Cold War world. Specifically, Francis Fukuyama, in The End of History and the Last Man, argued that the world had reached a Hegelian "end of history".

Huntington believed that while the age of ideology had ended, the world had reverted only to a normal state of affairs characterized by cultural conflict. In his thesis, he argued that the primary axis of conflict in the future will be along cultural and religious lines.
Postnationalism is the process or trend by which nation states and national identities lose their importance relative to supranational and global entities. Several factors contribute to its aspects including economic globalization, a rise in importance of multinational corporations, the internationalization of financial markets, the transfer of socio-political power from national authorities to supranational entities, such as multinational corporations, the United Nations and the European Union and the advent of new information and culture technologies such as the Internet. However attachment to citizenship and national identities often remains important.

Jan Zielonka of the University of Oxford states that "the future structure and exercise of political power will resemble the medieval model more than the Westphalian one" with the latter being about "concentration of power, sovereignty and clear-cut identity" and neo-medievalism meaning "overlapping authorities, divided sovereignty, multiple identities and governing institutions, and fuzzy borders".

See also

 Citizenship
 City network
 Country
 Government
 Identity (social science)
 Imagined Communities
 Invented tradition
 Lists of people by nationality
 Meta-ethnicity
 Multinational state
 National emblem
 National god
 National memory
 Nationalism
 Nationality
 People
 Polity
 Qaum
 Race (human categorization)
 Separatism
 Irredentism
 Society
 Sovereign state
 Stateless nation
 Tribe
 Republic
 Republicanism

References

Sources
 
 
 
 
 
 
 
Mylonas, Harris; Tudor, Maya (11 May 2021). "Nationalism: What We Know and What We Still Need to Know". Annual Review of Political Science. 24 (1): 109–132.

Further reading

 Manent, Pierre (2007). "What is a Nation?", The Intercollegiate Review, Vol. XLII, No. 2, pp. 23–31.
 Renan, Ernest (1896). "What is a Nation?" In: The Poetry of the Celtic Races, and Other Essays. London: The Walter Scott Publishing Co., pp. 61–83.
 
 
 
 
 
 
 

Ethnicity

Political geography
Political science terminology
Types of communities